Freebairn is a surname. Notable people with the surname include:

Alfred Robert Freebairn (1794–1846), English engraver
John Freebairn (1930–2016), Australian politician
Kate Freebairn, Australian journalist and television news presenter
Robert Freebairn (1765–1808), British landscape painter
Vanessa Freebairn-Smith, American cellist